Mu’ayyad al-Dīn Abu al-Qāsim ibn Ḥasan ibn ‘Ajlān al-Ḥasanī was Emir of Mecca twice between 1443 and 1447.

He was appointed in place of his brother Ali in Shawwal 846 AH (February 1443). He reigned until Rabi al-Awwal 849 AH (June/July 1445) when he was deposed by his brother Barakat. In Dhu al-Hijjah (March 1446) Barakat left Mecca to avoid capture by the Egyptian emirs and Abu al-Qasim returned to the Emirate. On 17 Rabi al-Awwal 851 AH (c. 2 June 1447), Abu al-Qasim received word that the Sultan had returned the Emirate to Barakat. He promptly departed from Mecca and went to Wadi al-Abar. He then journeyed to Egypt, where he died in 853 AH (1449/1450).

References

Emirs
15th-century people
People from Mecca